Sand Springs, also known as Dinnebito or Dinnebito Trading Post, is a populated place situated in Coconino County, Arizona, United States. It is one of two locations in Arizona with this name, the other being located in Apache County.

References

Populated places in Coconino County, Arizona